Nový Dvůr is the name of several locations in the Czech Republic: 

Nový Dvůr (Nymburk District) 
Nový Dvůr Monastery

See also
Novy Dvor, several localities in Belarus, Russia